The 2013 Shimizu S-Pulse season was Shimizu S-Pulse's 21st consecutive season in J.League Division 1. Shimizu S-Pulse also competed in the 2013 Emperor's Cup and 2013 J.League Cup.

J1 League results

S-Pulse finished the season ninth in the J.League.

References

External links
 J.League official site

Shimizu S-Pulse
Shimizu S-Pulse seasons